Acapulco is a 1952 Mexican romantic comedy film directed by Emilio Fernández and starring Elsa Aguirre, Armando Calvo and Miguel Torruco.

Cast
 Elsa Aguirre as Diana Lozano 
 Armando Calvo as Ricardo Serrano 
 Miguel Torruco as Alberto 
 Óscar Pulido as Don Julio, gerente hotel 
 José María Linares-Rivas as Don Delfín 
 Rodolfo Acosta as Alfredo 
 Maruja Grifell as Enriqueta 
 Mimí Derba as Abuela de Ricardo 
 Luis Arcaraz
 Manuel Calvo
 Eva Garza as Cantante 
 Antonio Haro Oliva  
 Carlos Riquelme as Alonso, mesero

References

Bibliography 
 Carl J. Mora. Mexican Cinema: Reflections of a Society, 1896-2004. McFarland, 2005.

External links 
 

1952 films
1952 romantic comedy films
Mexican romantic comedy films
1950s Spanish-language films
Films directed by Emilio Fernández
Films set in Acapulco
Mexican black-and-white films
1950s Mexican films